The 2003 FA Trophy Final was the 34th final of The Football Association's cup competition for levels 5–8 of the English football league system. It was contested by Burscough and Tamworth on 18 May 2003 at Villa Park in Birmingham.

Burscough won the match 2–1 to win the competition for the first time in their history.

Road to Villa Park

Burscough

Tamworth
As Tamworth were a Southern Football League club (they won the league in 2003 and secured promotion to the Football Conference), they entered the competition in the second round. Tamworth's cup run started with a home tie against their league rivals, Accrington Stanley. They went on to win the game 4–1. In the third round, the team was drawn at home against local rivals Nuneaton Borough, in which they won the game 3–0.
<div class="thumb tleft">

Match

Details

Notes
A.  Clubs competing in the Northern/Southern Football League Premier Division, receive a bye to the second round.

References

FA Trophy Finals
Fa Trophy Final
FA Trophy Final 2003
Burscough F.C. matches
May 2003 sports events in the United Kingdom